"Thank God for Mississippi" is an adage used in the United States, particularly in the South, that is generally used when discussing rankings of U.S. states. Since the U.S. state of Mississippi commonly ranks at or near the bottom of such rankings, residents of other states also ranking near the bottom may say, "Thank God for Mississippi", since the presence of that state in 50th place spares them the shame of being ranked last. 

Examples include rankings of educational achievement, business opportunities, obesity rates, overall health, the poverty rate, life expectancy, or other criteria of the quality of life or government in the 50 states. The phrase is in use even among state government officials and journalists, though occasionally with a slight modification. 

Mississippi's poor reputation is such a common trope in American culture that when Mississippi does indeed rank well in something, the phrase "Thank God for Mississippi" may get brought up just to discuss how it does not apply in the given circumstance. The saying comes from Mississippi's poor ranking as compared to the other forty-nine states, not from a global perspective. Indeed, while Mississippi may rank below all other U.S. states in many measures, and near the bottom in several others, by raw GDP per capita, at $28,944, it ranks above Saudi Arabia's $24,454, and is equivalent to that of countries such as Spain and Czech Republic.

History
The saying has been attributed since before the induction of Alaska and Hawaii as states in 1959, and its use, while found throughout the entire country, is especially common in Alabama, which shares significant cultural and historical ties with its neighbor and former Mississippi Territory co-constituent Mississippi. Its use is also noted in nearby Arkansas and other frequently low-ranking states such as Kentucky, West Virginia, and Texas.

The saying has become something of a cliché, and has seen usage across the nation with regard to rankings both serious and trivial, and the underlying logic has been extrapolated to other states and even countries.

The growing notoriety of the phrase has led some Mississippians themselves to despise the saying, not because it is false, but because it rings true and puts their state in a bad light. The phrase has been used as an attempt to rally Mississippians towards change.

See also
 List of states and territories of the United States
 Education in Mississippi

References

Adages
Mississippi society
American political catchphrases
Political metaphors referring to people
Society of the Southern United States